Yang Xiaoxu (born 20 October 1996) is a Chinese canoeist. He competed in the men's K-1 200 metres event at the 2020 Summer Olympics.

References

1996 births
Living people
Chinese male canoeists
Olympic canoeists of China
Canoeists at the 2020 Summer Olympics
People from Chengde